Bernard Wiber (24 June 1902 – 21 February 1995) was a French racing cyclist. He rode in the 1929 Tour de France.

References

1902 births
1995 deaths
French male cyclists
Place of birth missing